The Rotores de Portugal (Portuguese for "Rotors of Portugal") is a helicopter flight demonstration team created in 1976, operated by Squadron 552 of the Portuguese Air Force, based in No 11 Air Base, Beja. They are the national helicopter display team of Portugal and use three Sud Aviation Alouette III.

In 1976, the aerobatic team Rotores de Portugal was created by order of the Air Force Chief of Staff (CEMFA) to represent the Portuguese Air Force in several festivals all over the country. The team operated for 18 years while integrated with the 102 Squadron, and flew a total of 41 demonstrations.

As these helicopters were not exclusively used by the team, it started to be a common sight to see Alouette III sporting the special livery while performing the most varied missions, from search and rescue to airmobile assaults exercises. Even after the suspension of the  activity, these helicopters continued to sport their respective livery.

The last performing of the  occurred in 2010, with the team being currently inactive. Meanwhile, the Portuguese Air Force initiated the deactivation of their remaining Alouette III helicopters, which are being replaced by a smaller number of AgustaWestland AW119 Koala.

Aircraft, bases and squadrons

See also

Asas de Portugal

References

External links 
 Rotores de Portugal website 

Aerobatic teams
Portuguese Air Force